Pushkar Singh Dhami (born 16 September 1975) is an Indian politician and a member of the Bharatiya Janata Party, serving as the 10th and the current Chief Minister of Uttarakhand. He was elected as MLA in Uttarakhand Vidhan Sabha from Khatima in 2012 and 2017. He was appointed Chief Minister for the first time in 2021. He lost his seat in 2022 elections, but was re-elected as Chief Minister by BJP MLAs. He is the only Chief Minister of the state to assume a second consecutive term as CM ,since its creation.

On 3 June 2022 he successfully won the Champawat Assembly bypoll.

Personal life and career
Pushkar Singh Dhami was born in a Kumaoni Hindu Rajput family at Tundi village of Pithoragarh district. His ancestral village is Harkhola, Pithoragarh. His family moved to Tundi village where he studied until 5th standard after that they moved to Nagla Tarai Bhabar, Khatima. His father was in the army and retired as a Subedar.

He graduated from Lucknow University in Human Resource Management & Industrial Relations and pursued LL.B. from University of Lucknow. He has also served as an adviser to Bhagat Singh Koshiyari while Koshiyari was serving as the Chief Minister of Uttarakhand in 2001.

Political career

Dhami started his political career in the year 1990 with Akhil Bharatiya Vidyarthi Parishad, the student wing of the Bharatiya Janata Party. He also served as the state president of the Bharatiya Janata Yuva Morcha until 2008. During this time, he was credited with asserting the state government to reserve 70% of opportunities for the local youth in industries of the state.

Chief Minister in 2021 

On 3 July 2021, he was sworn in as the 10th Chief Minister of Uttarakhand, after the resignation of Tirath Singh Rawat due to political crisis regarding his legitimacy to hold the post and assumed office on 4 July 2021. Pushkar Singh Dhami worked as a political adviser to former CM Bhagat Singh Koshyari. He became the youngest Chief Minister of Uttarakhand at the age of 45.

Vidhan Sabha election, 2022
Pushkar Singh Dhami, the Current chief minister and a CM face, lost the 2022 legislative election against congress candidate, Bhuwan Chandra Kapri from Khatima constituency of Uttarakhand legislative assembly. He was re-elected for the position of Chief Minister of Uttarakhand on 21 March 2022.
On 3 June 2022 he successfully won the Champawat Assembly bypoll, which was allowed by the resignation of incumbent Kailash Chandra Gahtori.

Positions held

Elections contested

References 

|-

People from Udham Singh Nagar district
Chief Ministers of Uttarakhand
Chief ministers from Bharatiya Janata Party
Bharatiya Janata Party politicians from Uttarakhand
Members of the Uttarakhand Legislative Assembly
Living people
21st-century Indian politicians
1975 births